Anderleigh is a rural locality in the Gympie Region, Queensland, Australia.

History
Brookleigh Provisional School opened on 10 July 1895. In 1899 it was renamed Anderleigh Provisional School. It became Anderleigh State School in 1909. It closed on 24 July 1960.

References

Gympie Region
Localities in Queensland